The 1935 Oklahoma Sooners football team represented the University of Oklahoma in the 1935 college football season. In their first year under head coach Biff Jones, the Sooners compiled a 6–3 record (3–2 against conference opponents), finished in second place in the Big Six Conference, and outscored their opponents by a combined total of 99 to 44.

Tackle J. W. "Dub" Wheeler received All-America honors in 1935, and four Sooners received all-conference honors: Wheeler, backs Bill Breedon and Nick Robertson and tackle Ralph Brown.

Schedule

Source:

NFL Draft
One Sooner players was drafted as part of the inaugural NFL Draft following the season.

References

Oklahoma
Oklahoma Sooners football seasons
Oklahoma Sooners football